Luis Conrado Batlle y Berres (26 November 1897 – 15 July 1964) was a Uruguayan political figure.

Background
Batlle Berres was a journalist and prominent member of the Uruguayan Colorado Party. He was selected — in hindsight, with far-reaching effect — to serve as vice presidential running-mate for Luis Tomás Berreta.

Vice President of Uruguay
He served as Vice President of Uruguay in 1947, succeeding Alberto Guani and held this office upon the death of President Berreta.

Historical note
Batlle Berres was the fourth person to hold the office of Vice President of Uruguay. The office dates from 1934, when Alfredo Navarro became Uruguay's first Vice President. He served as the President of the Chamber of Deputies of Uruguay from 1943 to 1945.

President of Uruguay (1st period of office)
He was President of Uruguay from 1947 to 1951, being succeeded in the office by Andrés Martínez Trueba.

Various reforms were introduced during the Batlle Berres presidency. A law of September the 19th 1947 granted broad powers to the Executive Power to insure supplies and prevent excessive increases in prices of articles of prime necessities. A land reform law of 1948 sought to increase and improve agricultural production and improve the living conditions of rural workers. In 1948 part-time employees of the Jockey Club “not covered by the original fund became covered by a separate fund.” In 1950, family allowances were extended to civil servants and the military. Law 11,577 of October the 14th 1950 introduced a 6-hour day “for workers engaged in activities that are officially considered unhealthful because of working conditions or materials that are handled.” The same law granted women extensive rights during pregnancy and in the puerperium. 1950 amendments established a maximum of 3,000 pesos to be paid annually to anyone as accident insurance, but gave the State Insurance Bank “the power to raise this maximum on its own judgment through established legal procedures.”  In 1949 the budget for school canteens and milk  was increased, while new classes for children with hearing and sight defects were brought within the framework of special education. In 1950 new infant classes and kindergartens were opened, while a rural normal institute was set up “for giving certificated teachers, on paid leave of  absence, specialist training in rural education.” Refresher courses were instituted for the  teachers of handicapped children, while grants-in-aid were made to seventeen training college courses for young  teachers-in-training from the interior of the country. Under a law promulgated on December the 4th 1947, a housing finance section was established in the Mortgage Bank of Uruguay. Authorized to act independently of the other economic and financial divisions of the Bank, the new section was intended “to aid in the solution of Uruguay’s critical housing problem by loaning money for the acquisition, construction, and improvement of living quarters.” This new section also had the right to acquire land "by mutual agreement or by expropriation, to subdivide it, and to build dwellings for sale or for rent.” Also in regards to housing, a 1949 law was approved "granting special facilities to employees of the BHU." A Decree concerning Measures for the Prevention of Accidents to Workers Engaged in the Unloading of Coal and Salt dated 28 July 1949 "provides for the use of hooks with safety catches for all lifting equipment used in the unloading of coal and salt and for the blocking of trucks while salt is being unloaded. It also requires workers to use safety belts when they are at the top of hoppers." A law of December the 5th 1949 authorized compensation for farmers damaged by hail. Law No. 11,617 of October the 20th 1950 created the Retirement and Pension Fund for Rural Workers, Domestic Workers and Old Age Pensions.

Under Law 10960 the Bank of the Republic “is empowered to grant the dependent workers of the National Cooperative of Milk Producers, bank loans on their salaries and wages, in accordance with the provisions established in the law of November 21, 1941, extended by that of May 24, 1946.” Under Law 10999 of December 1947, a law on retirement benefits, “The benefit agreed by article 3 of Law number 10,014 is extended to the teaching staff of Physical Education throughout the country.” Law 10,997 of December 1947 amended a previous law (Law 10,436 of July 1943) in various ways, with 30% for the Ministry of Public Instruction and Social Welfare “so that through the National Food Institute it provides means of subsistence in appropriate premises to every inhabitant of the country who lacks them, under the control of Departmental Commissions designated by the Executive Power and that will be integrated by proportional representation, according to the result of the last elections of departmental authorities, and the candidates must be proposed by the political parties that have the right to integrate said Commissions.” Ian addition, the law provided 30% for the Children's Council, to invested in the creation or improvement of the services including promotion of the Education Section, the “Creation of public canteens for preschoolers where the lack of resources so requires,” the “Maintenance and foundation of maternity refectories that protect women in a state of pregnancy or who breastfeed their child,” and Maintenance and creation of “Gotas de Leche” and “Maintenance and creation of “Gotas De Leche” and contribution to others that do not depend on the Children's Council.”  A law of 1948 contained various provisions in regards to the sale and production of milk. Law 10937 of September 1947 extended “in favor of the machinists, stokers and drivers of cars-motors of the Administration of the Railways and Tramways of the Condition; machinists and stokers of the Directorates of Hydrography, Sanitation and Roads of the Ministry of Public Works and machinists, stokers, high voltage panel personnel and boiler repair personnel of the State Electric Power Plants, the benefits that Law number 9,700, of dated September 17, 1937, agrees to the machinists and stokers who provide services in private companies.”  In July 1950 the Uruguayan Congress appropriated 50,000 pesos to support the Farm Youth Movement (a Uruguayan equivalent of the 4-H Clubs) “which operates through the rural schools on a volunteer basis. Law 10949 of October 1947 authorized the Banco de la República “to extend the benefits of the operations "Loans on salaries", to the members of the Caja de Retirements of "Journalists and Graphics", which appear in the personnel of the houses where they provide services, as receiving their salaries on a daily basis. However, the other requirements imposed by the National Savings and Discount Fund for this type of operations must be fulfilled.”

A new rental regime was provided by Ley 11229 of 1948. Under Law 11,563 of 1950 “Facilities for the acquisition, construction, expansion and tax relief of housing are given to certain officials of the National Postal Savings Fund, the General Post Office and the Legislative Branch, with rules for carrying out operations.” Law 11024 authorized the Executive Power “to take from "Exchange Differences", the amount equivalent to one million dollars (U$S 1:000.00.00) as contribution of the Republic to the International Relief Fund for Childhood, created by resolution of the General Assembly of the Organization United Nations, December 11, 1946.” Law 11388 of 1949 provided for a subsidy to paid the National Work for the Protection and Education of Mentally Abnormal Minors (Obra Morquio), which was intended to provide “medical-pedagogical assistance to at least 180 mentally abnormal children, regardless of any philosophical, political or religious proselytism.” Law 11413 authorized the Executive Branch “to take from General Revenue the sum of $25,000.00 (twenty-five thousand pesos) for the payment of expenses caused by the intensification of the smallpox vaccination campaign throughout the territory of the Republic, organized by the Ministry of Public health.” Law 11431 authorized the Executive Branch to “dispose of General Revenues the sum of $ 25,000. (twenty-five thousand pesos) monthly and until the respective budget is approved, aimed at combating epidemic outbreaks that affect children, including scarlet fever, typhoid, measles, gastroenteritis and broncho-pulmonary conditions, etc.” Ley 11052 of 1948 provided for an increase “in the sum of two hundred seventy thousand pesos ($270,000.00) the "Public Works Debt 5% 1940" created by law number 9,953, of September 4, 1940, allocating said amount for the completion of the construction works of the San José Hospital.” Law 9940, passed back in 1940, provided for the protection of “public officials and their heirs by attributing to them the various benefits indicated therein.” In its original wording, in force until October 3, 1950, among the conditions required of adopted children was that of not having the right to a pension transmitted by their natural family. If the adoptive father or mother died first , the situation , at the death of the legitimate ones, was not as clear as in the previous case . The issue was resolved by Law 11,520, of October 3, 1950, which gave a new wording to Article 55 of Law 9,940: “These children can opt for the pension caused by the adoptive father or mother or that caused by the natural father or mother.”

Within the Colorado Party, he is now widely acknowledged for being the founder of the political branch known as Neo-Batllism. In this first period of Presidential office, the Vice President of Uruguay was Alfeo Brum.

President of Uruguay (2nd period of office)
Batlle Berres was President of the National Council of Government of Uruguay from 1955 to 1956. Batlle thus both preceded and succeeded Andrés Martínez Trueba as President.

Background
The great great grandson of Catalan settlers from Sitges, Spain, he was the son of another political figure, Luis Batlle y Ordóñez, brother of ex president José Batlle. His mother, Petrona Berres, was of Irish descent and died when he was still a small child. Then, his father remarried but died soon after, in 1908. As a result, he went to live with his uncle,  José Batlle y Ordóñez, the three-time President of Uruguay, and his cousins César,  Rafael and Lorenzo Batlle Pacheco on the Piedras Blancas estate in the suburbs of Montevideo.

In 1927, he married Matilde Ibáñez Tálice, with whom he had three children: the also ex president Jorge Batlle, concert pianist Luis Batlle and Matilde Linda Batlle, the latter born in Argentina.

He was a member of the Colorado Party.

Bibliography

See also
 List of political families#Uruguay
 Tomás Berreta#Death and succession

References

External links

Presidents of Uruguay
Vice presidents of Uruguay
Presidents of the Senate of Uruguay
Uruguayan vice-presidential candidates
Uruguayan people of Catalan descent
Uruguayan people of Irish descent
1897 births
1964 deaths
Presidents of the Chamber of Representatives of Uruguay
Presidents of the National Council of Government (Uruguay)
Place of birth missing
Colorado Party (Uruguay) politicians
Burials at the Central Cemetery of Montevideo